Brest Airport is an airport serving Brest, a city in Belarus.

Airlines and destinations

Statistics

References

External links
 
 

Airports in Belarus
Buildings and structures in Brest, Belarus